Beate Jasch (born 16 January 1959) is a retired German swimmer who won a silver medal at the 1974 European Aquatics Championships. She competed at the 1976 Summer Olympics in the 100 m and 200 m butterfly and 100 m and 4 × 100 m freestyle events and finished eighth in the relay. During her career she won four national titles in the 100 m (1976) and 200 m (1976, 1977) butterfly and 200 medley (1976).

References

1959 births
Living people
German female swimmers
Swimmers at the 1976 Summer Olympics
Olympic swimmers of West Germany
Sportspeople from Krefeld
European Aquatics Championships medalists in swimming
German female butterfly swimmers
20th-century German women
21st-century German women